Jeongjong of Goryeo (923 – 13 April 949) (r. 945–949) was the third monarch of the Goryeo dynasty of Korea. He was the third son of King Taejo, the founder of the kingdom and was born more than a decade before Goryeo was formally established.

Jeongjong rose to the throne after his half-brother King Hyejong died, and set to reducing the power of various royal in-laws, including Wang Gyu and Pak Sul-hui. However, lacking the support of the Gaegyeong elites, he was unable to substantially strengthen the throne.

In 946, he spent 70,000 sacks of grain from the royal storehouses to support Buddhism in the country. In 947, he had the fortress of Pyongyang constructed as the country's Western Capital. He sought to move the capital from Gaegyeong to Pyongyang, but was not successful.
Jeongjong became paranoid however that people inside the palace were conspiring to kill him and he then started to go insane. After four years of his reign, he died just after he signed a royal decree to make his brother, the fourth prince Wang So (known as Gwangjong), king instead of his son.

Family
Father: Taejo of Goryeo (고려 태조)
Grandfather: Sejo of Goryeo (고려 세조)
Grandmother: Queen Wisuk (위숙왕후)
Mother: Queen Sinmyeong (신명왕후)
Grandfather: Yu Geung-dal (유긍달)
Consorts and their Respective Issue(s):
Queen Mungong of the Suncheon Bak clan (문공왕후 박씨) – No issue.
Queen Munseong of the Suncheon Bak clan (문성왕후 박씨)
Prince Gyeongchunwon (경춘원군)
Princess Wang (공주 왕씨)
Lady Cheongjunamwon of the Cheongju Gim clan (청주남원부인 김씨) – No issue.

In popular culture
 Portrayed by Kim Young-chan in the 2000-2002 KBS1 TV series Taejo Wang Geon
Portrayed by Choi Jae-sung in the 2002–2003 KBS TV series The Dawn of the Empire.
 Portrayed by Ryu Seung-soo in the 2015 MBC TV series Shine or Go Crazy.
 Portrayed by Hong Jong-hyun in the 2016 SBS TV series Moon Lovers: Scarlet Heart Ryeo.

See also
List of Korean monarchs
Jeongjong, 10th Monarch of Goryeo

References

 

Goryeo Buddhists
923 births
949 deaths
10th-century Korean monarchs
Leaders who took power by coup
Korean Buddhist monarchs
People from Kaesong